Karol Szymanowski completed his Symphony No. 2 in B flat major, Op. 19 in 1909 at the age of 27. Szymanowski was greatly influenced by German culture and the symphony has many echoes of Richard Strauss and Max Reger. This symphony introduced Szymanowski to Europe in 1911-12, following its Warsaw premiere on 7 April 1911 and it was heard in Berlin, Leipzig and Vienna. The symphony was published soon after the composer's death after much revision. This symphony and its use of a solo violin laid the foundation, so to speak, of Szymanowski's first Violin Concerto. A typical performance of the symphony lasts about 30 minutes.

Form 
The symphony is supposed to show off the composer's prowess as a contrapuntalist. The work unconventional for its time, is in two movements and begins in a typical Szymanowski manner (also with a similarity to Scriabin) with a violin solo:

Instrumentation 

Szymanowski scored his symphony for a large orchestra consisting of standard instruments:

Woodwind
3 Flutes
3 Oboes or
(2 Oboes and 1 Cor anglais)
2 Clarinets in B
1 B and 1 E Clarinet or
(1 Bass Clarinet)
3 Bassoons

Brass
4 Horns in F
3 Trumpets in B
3 Trombones
Tuba

Percussion
Perc(3)
Harp

Strings
1st and 2nd Violins
Violas
Cellos
Contra basses

Evaluation 
Conductor Antoni Wit deems the symphony a very challenging work, explaining that when he is asked to conduct it he replies that the orchestra won't have it easy and the performance will require more work than usual and each musician to prepare its part before the rehearsals, but that nevertheless it will be worth it.

References

External links 
 

Symphonies by Karol Szymanowski
1909 compositions
20th-century symphonies
Compositions in B-flat major